The 1892 United States presidential election in Indiana took place on November 8, 1892. All contemporary 44 states were part of the 1892 United States presidential election. Indiana voters chose 15 electors to the Electoral College, which selected the president and vice president.

Indiana was won by the Democratic nominees, former President Grover Cleveland of New York and his running mate Adlai Stevenson I of Illinois. Harrison was the first Republican since 1856 to lose their home state.

Results

See also
 United States presidential elections in Indiana

Notes

References

Indiana
1892
1892 Indiana elections